Gerard James Butler (born 13 November 1969) is a Scottish actor and film producer. After studying law, he turned to acting in the mid-1990s with small roles in productions such as Mrs Brown (1997), the James Bond film Tomorrow Never Dies (1997), and Tale of the Mummy (1998). In 2000, he starred as Count Dracula in the gothic horror film Dracula 2000 with Christopher Plummer and Jonny Lee Miller.

He played Attila the Hun in the miniseries Attila (2001), then appeared in the films Reign of Fire with Christian Bale (2002) and Lara Croft: Tomb Raider – The Cradle of Life with Angelina Jolie (2003) before playing André Marek in the adaptation of Michael Crichton's science fiction adventure Timeline (2003). He then was cast as Erik, The Phantom in Joel Schumacher's 2004 film adaptation of the musical The Phantom of the Opera, with Emmy Rossum; it earned him a Satellite Award nomination for Best Actor.

Butler gained worldwide recognition for his portrayal of King Leonidas in Zack Snyder's fantasy war film 300. That role earned him nominations for an Empire Award for Best Actor and a Saturn Award for Best Actor and a win for MTV Movie Award for Best Fight. He voiced Stoick the Vast in the critically and commercially successful How to Train Your Dragon franchise (2010–2019). Also in the 2010s, he portrayed Secret Service agent Mike Banning in the action thriller series Olympus Has Fallen, London Has Fallen, Angel Has Fallen and the upcoming Night Has Fallen. He played military leader Tullus Aufidius in the 2011 film Coriolanus, a modern adaptation of Shakespeare's tragedy of the same name, and Sam Childers in the 2011 action biopic Machine Gun Preacher.

Early life
Butler was born in Paisley, Renfrewshire, Scotland, the youngest of three children of Margaret and Edward Butler, a bookmaker. He is from a Catholic family of Irish descent. His family moved to Montreal, Quebec, Canada when he was six months old. A year later, when his parents' marriage broke down, his mother left Quebec and returned to Scotland with Gerard, aged 18 months.

Butler was head boy at St Mirin's & St Margaret's High School in Paisley and won a place at University of Glasgow School of Law. He also attended Scottish Youth Theatre while a teenager. He did not see his father again until he was 16, when Edward Butler called to meet him at a Glasgow restaurant. After the meeting, Butler cried for hours, and recalled later: "That emotion showed me how much pain can sit in this body of yours; pain and sorrow that you don't know you have until it is unleashed."

As a student, he was the president of the university law society, a position he later said he "kind of blagged my way into". When Butler was 22, his father was diagnosed with cancer and died. He said of this period in his life: "I had gone from a 16-year-old who couldn't wait to grasp life to a 22-year-old who didn't care if he died in his sleep."

Before his final year of law school, Butler took a year off to live in California—mostly in Venice Beach, where he held different jobs, traveled often, and, he says, drank heavily; at one point he was arrested for alcohol-related disorderly conduct. Describing his behaviour during that year, he recalled: "I was out of control, and justifying it with this idea that 'I'm young, this is life. This is me just being boisterous.' " After his time off in America, he returned to Scotland to finish his final year at law school.
He had ear surgery as a child that left him with a mangled ear. He still suffers from tinnitus and has hearing loss in his right ear.

Career

Legal career and early acting career
Upon graduation, he took a position as a trainee lawyer at an Edinburgh law firm. However, he continued to stay out late drinking and frequently missed work. One week before he qualified as a lawyer, he was fired. At the age of 25, and an unqualified lawyer, he moved to London to pursue his dream of becoming famous. He admitted, "When I started out, I'm not sure I was actually in it for the right reasons. I wanted very much to be famous."

Initially unable to win any acting roles, he worked in a variety of jobs including as a waiter, a telemarketer and a toy demonstrator at fairs. In London, he met an old friend from his teenage days in the Scottish Youth Theatre, who was now a London casting director. At that time, he was her boyfriend and her assistant. She took him to an audition for Steven Berkoff's play of Coriolanus. The director said of Butler's audition, "When he read, he had such vigour and enthusiasm—so much that it made the other actors seem limp—that I decided to cast him in the ensemble."

Then aged 27, Butler had his first professional acting job. Less than a year later, he won a part in a theatre adaptation of Trainspotting at the Edinburgh Festival. At age 30, he decided to move to Los Angeles, where he won parts in Dracula 2000, Tomb Raider 2, Dear Frankie and Phantom of the Opera.

Acting career

In London, Butler had various odd jobs until being cast by actor and director Steven Berkoff (who later appeared alongside him in Attila (2001)) in a stage production of Coriolanus. He was cast as Ewan McGregor's character Renton in the stage adaptation of Trainspotting, the same play that had inspired him to become an actor. His film debut was as Billy Connolly's character's younger brother in Mrs Brown (1997).

His film career continued with small roles, first in the James Bond film Tomorrow Never Dies (1997) and then Russell Mulcahy's Tale of the Mummy (1998). In 2000, Butler was cast in two breakthrough roles, the first being Attila the Hun in the American TV miniseries Attila (2001). The film's producers wanted a known actor to play the part but eventually chose Butler. He was cast as Dracula in Dracula 2000 (2000).

He then appeared in Reign of Fire (2002) as Creedy and Lara Croft: Tomb Raider – The Cradle of Life (2003) as Terry Sheridan, alongside Angelina Jolie. In the role of Andre Marek in the big-screen adaptation of Michael Crichton's novel Timeline (2003), Butler played an archaeologist who was sent back in time with a team of students to rescue a colleague.
In 2003, director Joel Schumacher was deciding on the principal casting for the film The Phantom of the Opera, a film adaptation of the Andrew Lloyd Webber musical of the same name, and thought of Butler, whom he had seen earlier in the film Dracula 2000, to play the title character. Butler, who had had no musical experience other than singing in a rock band while he was studying to be a lawyer, was surprised at the interest, but immediately began taking singing lessons with a vocal coach. He then did an acting audition with Schumacher, and a singing audition with Lloyd Webber, both of whom were impressed by his performance. The film, and Butler's performance, received mixed reviews, though Butler was nominated for a Satellite Award for Best Actor.

Other projects that followed include Dear Frankie (2005), The Game of Their Lives (2005) and Beowulf & Grendel (2005).

In 2006, he starred as Spartan King Leonidas in the Warner Bros. production 300, which is often described as his breakthrough role. Butler, who said he "wanted to look really strong" in the film, trained with a high-intensity workout for four months prior to the film's shooting. In 2007, he appeared in Butterfly on a Wheel co-starring Pierce Brosnan and Maria Bello, which aired on network TV under the title Shattered, and in the romantic comedy P.S. I Love You with Hilary Swank. In 2008, he appeared in Nim's Island and RocknRolla. In 2009, he starred in the Neveldine/Taylor film Gamer, The Ugly Truth and Law Abiding Citizen, which he also co-produced. In 2010 he starred in the action/comedy The Bounty Hunter with Jennifer Aniston, and did voice acting for the 2010 animated film How to Train Your Dragon as Stoick the Vast.

On 15 and 16 October 2010, thanks to the popularity of his role as Spartan King Leonidas and the use of his lines during athletic events at Michigan State University, he was a guest at their Midnight Madness and homecoming American football game.

, Butler, while filming Playing for Keeps, was writing songs and in the process of recording an album. He disavowed gossip reports that Marilyn Manson and Johnny Depp had advised him on the project. On 18 December that year, while filming Chasing Mavericks, Butler was hospitalized after he was pulled under big waves. Subsequently, he was taken to Stanford University Medical Center and later released.

Butler starred as Secret Service agent Mike Banning in the action thriller Olympus Has Fallen (2013), opposite co-stars Aaron Eckhart and Morgan Freeman. He said he broke two bones in his neck while shooting the film, but did not realise this until he had an MRI scan. Butler reprised his voice role as Stoick in How to Train Your Dragon 2 in 2014. Two years later, he reprised his role as Mike Banning in the Olympus Has Fallen sequel London Has Fallen and also portrayed Set in Gods of Egypt. Late in 2018 Butler starred as submarine captain Commander Joe Glass of the USS Arkansas, a Virginia class nuclear submarine, in the film Hunter Killer. He starred as Mike Banning again in the 2019 film Angel Has Fallen.   After release delays due to COVID-19, Butler starred in Greenland in Fall 2020.

He has been a member of the Academy of Motion Picture Arts and Sciences in the Actor's Branch since 2011.

Personal life

Since October 2011, Butler has divided his time between Los Angeles and Glasgow. In 2011 he was rushed to the Stanford University Medical Center after suffering a surfing incident in Mavericks, California during the filming of Of Men and Mavericks. He was stable and released from the hospital later that week. 

Butler has stated in interviews that he no longer drinks alcohol. In February 2012, it was announced that he had completed a course of treatment for substance abuse of painkillers at a rehabilitation facility. He was concerned he had become too reliant on prescribed pain medication, which escalated after his surfing accident.

In 2011 Butler played in a charity match for Celtic F.C., a football club he has supported since childhood. A year later he represented Celtic in a Hollywood film, starring as a "has-been" player in Playing for Keeps. In August 2013, he bought an equity stake in the Jamaica Tallawahs cricket team, part of the Limacol Caribbean Premier League (CPL). He has supported the charity Mary's Meals since 2010. He visited the international development charity's programme in Liberia in 2014. In 2018 he attended a fundraiser gala organised by Friends of the Israel Defense Forces (FIDF), which raised $60 million. In November 2018, Butler's home was destroyed in the Woolsey Fire in California.

Filmography

Awards and nominations

References

External links

 
 
 

1969 births
Living people
20th-century Scottish male actors
21st-century Scottish male actors
Alumni of the University of Glasgow
Male actors from Glasgow
Male actors from Paisley, Renfrewshire
Scottish expatriates in the United States
Scottish film producers
Scottish male film actors
Scottish male stage actors
Scottish male television actors
Scottish people of Irish descent
Scottish Roman Catholics